The 2022 America East Conference softball tournament will be held at University Field on the campus of Stony Brook University in Stony Brook, New York from May 25 through May 28, 2022. The tournament will earn the America East Conference's automatic bid to the 2022 NCAA Division I softball tournament.

Tournament

References

Tournament
America East Conference softball tournament
Sports competitions in New York (state)
Stony Brook University
2022 in sports in New York (state)